Natalia Taubina  is a human rights activist. 

She was the Director at the Russian Research Center for Human Rights and the Foundation for Civil Society. She is the head of Public Verdict which helps of victims of police abuse. She was awarded  the  Human Rights Watch's Alison Des Forges Award for Extraordinary Activism. She was also awarded the Robert F. Kennedy Human Rights Award for her work.

References

Year of birth missing (living people)
Living people
Russian human rights activists

Women human rights activists
Robert F. Kennedy Human Rights Award laureates